"Runnin' Wild" is the 1st single from the album Runnin' Wild by the Australian hard rock band Airbourne.

Music video
The music video for this song shows Airbourne in the back of a truck playing while being chased by the LAPD. It also features a guest appearance by Lemmy Kilmister of Motörhead as the driver of the truck, eventually locking the pursuing policemen inside the truck (whilst wearing a Motörhead jacket) after it has stopped and the band has left it.

Personnel
Joel O'Keeffe - lead vocals, lead guitar
David Roads - rhythm guitar, backing vocals
Justin Street - bass, backing vocals
Ryan O'Keeffe - drums

Chart performance

Release history

In popular culture
"Runnin' Wild" is featured in the EA Sports video games Madden 08,  NASCAR 09 and NHL 09, and was featured in a commercial for the 2008 game Battlefield: Bad Company. It is also usually played during warmups at Philadelphia Flyers games and is also featured on EA Sports NHL 09. The track was released as downloadable content for the music video game Rock Band on August 12, 2008 and later for Rock Band 2, but was removed for purchase on March 19, 2010 for unknown reasons. It was also used in the trailer for the 2010 Disney animated movie Tangled as well as TV spots for another Disney film, Frozen.  The 2016 movie Bad Moms features the song where the main characters rush to the PTA meeting leading up to the climactic scene. It is also featured in an online racing video game The Crew 2 on radio station “Rock This.” The song is also used in Season 5, Episode 10 "Head of the Snake" of Cobra Kai as Johnny Lawrence defends himself against four of Cobra Kai's Instructors at Terry Silver's house.

References

External links

2007 singles
Airbourne (band) songs
Song recordings produced by Bob Marlette
2007 songs
Roadrunner Records singles
EMI Records singles